Chariessa pilosa is a species of checkered beetle in the family Cleridae. It is found in Europe and Northern Asia (excluding China) and North America.

References

Further reading

External links

 

Cleridae
Articles created by Qbugbot
Beetles described in 1781